Hoplorana nigroscutata is a species of beetle in the family Cerambycidae. It was described by Fairmaire in 1905. It is known from Madagascar.

References

Desmiphorini
Beetles described in 1905